National Route 40, also known as RN40 or "Ruta 40", is a route in western Argentina, stretching from Punta Loyola near Rio Gallegos in Santa Cruz Province in the south to La Quiaca in Jujuy Province in the north. The route parallels the Andes mountains. The southern part of the route, by now largely paved, has become a well-known adventure tourism journey, and there are plans to pave the whole road.

At its traditional southern end near the city of Río Gallegos, it starts at sea level. It then crosses 20 national parks, 18 major rivers, and 27 passes in the Andes.

The road crosses the provinces of Santa Cruz, Chubut, Río Negro, Neuquen, Mendoza, San Juan, La Rioja, Catamarca, Tucumán, Salta, and Jujuy.

Description

Incorporation of sections of other highways into RN40, along with paving, is part of an Argentine government initiative to promote national tourism by drawing upon the legendary and some say mythical attraction attached to the route. The attraction is international in scope, and many websites around the world advertise the private and commercial adventures associated with travel on this roadway.

There are a number of internationally important sites along this route. Cueva de las Manos contains cave art dating back some 13,000 years. Los Glaciares National Park, the second largest national park in Argentina, and the Calchaquí Valleys also are near the route.

North

RN40 begins at the Bolivian border at La Quiaca. From there it goes west to San Juan de Oro, then turns south, parallel to the Andes, by San Antonio de los Cobres and Cachi and through the Calchaquí Valleys to Cafayate, then via Belén, Villa Unión to San Juan. From San Juan, RN40 is a busy highway to Mendoza.

South

From Mendoza, RN40 continues south to Pareditas, Malargüe, Chos Malal, and Zapala. It takes a route to the east of Bariloche to El Maitén and a junction with RN258 at Leleque. It then passes near Esquel and continues by Tecka, José de San Martín, and Alto Río Senguer to a junction with the RN43 at the town of Perito Moreno.

The road then enters the most remote part of its route.  south of Perito Moreno is the junction with a side road to Cueva de las Manos, and  farther is the tiny settlement of Bajo Caracoles (population 100). After a further , there is a junction with the road to Perito Moreno National Park, but there is no habitation apart from a police station and later an estancia until the small town of Tres Lagos, some  further south. The route then takes a roundabout route to Rio Gallegos through the town of 28 de Noviembre, where it turns east to follow the valley of the Gallegos River. It reaches the Atlantic coast at Punta Loyola, at the mouth of the Gallegos River  from Rio Gallegos.

History
Since the beginning of its construction in 1935, the route has changed several times. On 24 November 2004, the Argentine national directorate of highways (Dirección Nacional de Vialidad) promulgated Resolution 1.748/04, which changed the milestone markings and placed the "zero" kilometer stone at the new southernmost extreme of the road, at Cabo Virgenes, near the Straits of Magellan. Because in January 2009 there was no roadway constructed between the new marker location at Cabo Virgenes and Punta Loyola (near Río Gallegos), the provisional driving starting point as of early 2009 was at the KM 100 location.

Before 2004, RN40 was divided into "Ruta 40 Sur" (south) and "Ruta 40 Norte" (north) with the earlier "traditional" zero-km starting point at the intersection of San Martín and Garibaldi streets in the city of Mendoza, in Mendoza Province. That zero-km marker was subsequently moved to the eastern access point of that city, at the intersection of RN7 and Gob Avenue. Ricardo Videla (also known as Avenida Costanera). The intent of new legislation and remarking of roadways will move the traditional northern terminus of RN40 to the frontier with Bolivia near the location of Ciénaga de Paicone.

Latest developments

On 20 May 2006, the Argentine national highway directorate and the Jujuy provincial highway department signed an agreement in which sections of Jujuy provincial highways 85, 70, 74, 7, 64, 65, and 5 were transferred to national control for the construction of the so-called "Mining Corridor",  which will become the new path of RN40, more toward the west in that province. The agreement was ratified by provincial law 5520. Accordingly, the section of the road between San Antonio de los Cobres and Abra Pampa is renamed National Route 1V40.

In February 2009, President Cristina Kirchner announced that the remaining unpaved length of the route in Santa Cruz would be paved.

Gallery

References

National roads in Santa Cruz Province, Argentina
National roads in Chubut Province
National roads in Río Negro Province
National roads in Neuquén Province
National roads in Mendoza Province
National roads in San Juan Province, Argentina
National roads in La Rioja Province, Argentina
National roads in Catamarca Province
National roads in Tucumán Province
National roads in Salta Province
National roads in Jujuy Province